Vasantha Vaasal is a 1996 Indian Tamil-language action romance film directed by M.R. The movie stars Vijay and Swathi, while Mansoor Ali Khan, Vadivelu, and Kovai Sarala play supporting roles. This was a debut film for the music director Masa. The film was originally scheduled to be released in 1995, but was delayed later in March 1996. Vijay's original name was used as the film character name in this film. The film was declare box office failure but after its release the film got a separate cult fan base.

Plot 
Vijay comes to the city with an ambition to star in movies as he is totally mad about cinema. He lives as a tenant in Divya's  house. He tries acting out film scenes and speaking film dialogues in a loud fashion, thus disturbing her studies. Thus, both of them get off on the wrong foot, but they finally fall in love with each other. Ganesh is Divya's maternal uncle who also wants to marry her. Ganesh starts to disturb the lovers, but Vijay fights for Divya and finally wins her hand.

Cast

Production 
Vasantha Vaasal was the first film where Vijay acted for an "outside banner".

Soundtrack 
All songs were written by Masa, Uma Kannadasan, M.R. Music was composed by Masa.

References

External links 
 

1996 films
1990s Tamil-language films